is a 2005 Japanese horror drama film written and directed by Sion Sono.

A narrated fiction presents the story of school principal Ozawa Gozo, who rapes his daughter, Mitsuko, after she sees her parents having sex. Her mother Sayuri witnesses the rape. Gozo now rapes both of them as he pleases, while his family is undermined by incest, suicide, and murder. This narrative is contained within a frame story written by wheelchair-using novelist Taeko. Taeko is assisted by Yuji, a young man who secretly seeks to uncover the possible origins of this story within Taeko's past, and to learn the mysteries of a locked room in her apartment.

Plot
At the titular Strange Circus, we see the start of a burlesque performance. The MC brings out a guillotine and offers the strange array of characters a chance to die on stage, before bringing a young girl on stage. The girl states that she has always been on the execution stand, if not for her, then for her mother.

Mitsuko is a twelve-year-old girl whose father is the sexually deviant principal of her school. After noticing that Mitsuko had seen her parents having sex, Gozo summons her to his office at school, has her climb into a cello case with a peephole, then has sex with her mother Sayuri without her knowing her daughter is watching. Shortly after, Gozo rapes Mitsuko, which is discovered by Sayuri. Afterward, Gozo has sex with Sayuri, with Mitsuko still watching in the cello case. Gozo then reveals to Sayuri that Mitsuko has been watching for a long time. He then coerces Sayuri into the cello case to watch him rape her daughter.

Mitsuko has issues separating her identity from her mother. Because she is forced to both have sex with Gozo and watch her mother having sex with him, she begins to disassociate and takes on the role of her mother. As a result of the infidelity, rape, and incest, Sayuri becomes abusive toward Mitsuko. During one violent encounter, Mitsuko knocks her down the stairs. Sayuri apologizes but ultimately dies from the fall. Alone with her incestuous father, Mitsuko takes on the identity of the 35-year-old Sayuri, going to school and having sex with her father as Sayuri would have. After another breakdown, Mitsuko attempts suicide by throwing herself off a ledge. She survives the fall and is reliant on a wheelchair. Gozo tells Mitsuko that she needs to keep their little secret.

It is then revealed that this tale is being written by a reclusive wheelchair-using writer, Taeko. She takes an interest in the new assistant, Yûji Tamiya, asking him to read the story, one of many exclusively about Mitsuko. She is protective over a red door in her studio, not allowing anyone to enter. She asks Yûji to take her on a walk and he takes her up to a hill in Aobadai. There, she dismisses him and wheels herself up a hill, only to stand, collapse it, and walk away with it in tow. When she returns home, she enters the red room and we find that it is completely filthy with a cello case at its center that she talks to. She adopts a disguise and goes out shopping, purposely driving away some girls gossiping about her while reading her books. Taeko's editor tells Yûji that Taeko is faking her paralysis, and asks him to spy on her so they can have a good scoop for their magazine. Yûji agrees.

Meanwhile, Mitsuko is having trouble adjusting to life in a wheelchair. She is ignored by her classmates and Gozo neglects her in favor of having sex with various women he keeps around the house. In the present, inside Mitsuko's red room, she is sloppily eating spaghetti while writing her novel on top of the cello case. She forces food into the hole, before celebrating the completion of her novel.

Yûji is revealed to have a giant mural dedicated to Taeko. We see him at a body modification support group, where he reveals surgery he had to "be a vase that compliments the flowers [that reflect his soul]."

Mitsuko finds her mother's lost earring but one of Gozo's women takes it and swallows it to spite her, causing Mitsuko to have another breakdown. Due to this, Gozo ends up storing her in the cello case once again.

Taeko celebrates finishing her novel by presenting it to Yûji, then taking a trip to the beach with him. While on the train ride, they spot someone with a cello case and she comments on it. Yûji reveals he was told that being raped was akin to being only a torso. He offers the suggestion to turn both Mitsuko and Gozo into torsos at the end of the novel. Taeko loves the idea.

The viewer is put into the point of view of Sayuri, bound and gagged inside the cello case that Taeko and Yûji spotted on the train earlier.

Taeko wakes up in a hotel room with Yûji, unable to remember how she got there. When they go for a walk, Taeko spots a bathing suit and asks Yûji to buy it for her. While he's inside the shop, the man with the cello case from the train approaches her and she starts screaming. Yûji manages to get him to leave. Once again in the hotel room, Taeko asks Yûji to put the bathing suit on her, citing his infamous lack of libido as why she feels safe asking him to do this. Afterward, she is put to bed by Yûji and she dreams of the Strange Circus, with a nude, bloodied Sayuri laying in the center of the room.

When she wakes up, she notices that she had a nosebleed. She finds Yûji asleep on the bed, and decides to get up and sneak into the bathroom to clean herself up. While she's doing that, Yûji wakes up and sneaks a page of her manuscript into her purse. He manages to get back into position, feigning sleep, right before she reenters the room. She climbs back into bed and wakes up Yûji, with both pretending to just wake up, and asks to be taken home.

In the red room, she "serves dinner" to the cello case. She receives a call from Yûji who tells her that a page of her manuscript is missing and he needs it tonight for the editor. She rushes out with the page, only for it to be revealed that Yûji has been waiting outside her studio. He enters the red room, finding the cello case, and addresses it with familiarity. Taeko, however, shows up in Aobadai, pulls out her wheelchair and makes her way to the hill. She receives a call from Yûji, who says he's with her "pet" and tells her to return to her childhood home. She returns to the red room to find the cello case empty.

Taeko arrives at the house we saw Mitsuko grow up in, still toting her wheelchair with her in attempt to keep up the ruse. When Yûji appears, he dumps her out of the wheelchair, though she still acts like she is paralyzed. He challenges her memory and she deduces she was Mitsuko, despite never quite being sure. When he refers to her as "Mother" she can't quite understand what is going on. He helps her back into the wheelchair before taking her upstairs to Gozo's bedroom, where they find Gozo as nothing more than a bloody torso, though still very much alive, bound in chains. Yûji has set up a table for Taeko to write, but we realize that Taeko is not Mitsuko, but Sayuri, still alive.

In a recontextualization of the opening story, we learn that Sayuri accepted her treatment at the hands of Gozo by focusing on her transformation as desirable. Yûji reveals his body modification, intense scarification where his breasts used to be. It's then revealed that it was Mitsuko who was thrown down the stairs, not Sayuri. Mitsuko survived and was pulled out of her abusive household and put into foster care. She tried to return, only to find that Sayuri could not cope with how terrible of a person she was, and had escaped into the persona of Mitsuko, including going to school and having sex with Gozo, both dressed as and addressing herself as Mitsuko. Sayuri shoved Gozo down the stairs after coming face-to-face with his harem, leaving him broken. After she finished her first novel, she took the name Taeko and stole his wheelchair, storing him in the cello case he was so fond of using.

All this breaks modern day Taeko. Yûji appears to forgive Taeko, allowing her to become Sayuri again, only for Yûji to grab a chainsaw to turn her into a torso like Gozo.

Taeko wakes up screaming in the hotel room with Yûji. Her screaming wakes up Yûji, but, when she asks for her wheelchair, he has no idea what she is talking about. She finally stands up in front of him, but he insists that she has never been paralyzed. When she questions that, she awakens on the bed next to Gozo, chained up, with Yûji standing over her with the chainsaw, laughing.

We end back at the Strange Circus. The MC presents Sayuri with her head in the guillotine. Everyone claps for her. The MC rips off their face to reveal it's Gozo leading the performance, and we see the various characters, including Taeko's editor, his brothers, teen Mitsuko, Gozo's lovers, and finally young Mitsuko and Yûji, who give her a standing ovation. Gozo wishes her well, and the guillotine drops.

Cast
Masumi Miyazaki as Sayuri / Taeko 
Issei Ishida as Yûji Tamiya
Rie Kuwana as Young Mitsuko 
Mai Takahashi as Young Mitsuko 
Fujiko   
Madame Regine   
Tomorowo Taguchi as Taeko's Editor
Hiroshi Ohguchi as Gozo

Reception
Russell Edwards of Variety wrote that the film "shocks, provokes but ultimately bores with its tasteless indulgences" and that it "will be most at home at midnight fest sidebars, or anywhere else where a trash aesthetic is embraced."

References

External links 
 

2005 films
Japanese horror drama films
Japanese LGBT-related films
Incest in film
Transgender-related films
Films about writers
Films directed by Sion Sono
2000s horror drama films
Films about rape
2005 LGBT-related films
2005 drama films
2000s Japanese films